This article contains a list of Mayors of Biloxi, Mississippi, United States.

History
After receiving its charter in 1838, Biloxi was classified as a township and elected a president and a board of selectmen. On the eve of the American Civil War, these titles were changed to mayor and aldermen and were part-time positions. In 1919, Biloxi voters opted to have a new full-time government with a mayor and two commissioners elected to four-year terms. This system remained in place until voters again amended the city's governing structure in 1978, approving a mayor-council form of government with a city-wide elected mayor and councilmen elected from seven wards in the city, which went into effect at the 1981 elections.

List of mayors (1919–present)

Sources
"History of Biloxi governance," from Inauguration Program, and captions from Gallery of Mayors photo exhibit on second floor of City Hall.

References

City of Biloxi: The full-time mayors of Biloxi

 
Biloxi, Mississippi